Nobs is a Swiss surname.

Notable people
Notable people with this surname include:
 Armindo Nobs Ferreira, Brazilian football manager
 Claude Nobs (1936-2013), Swiss festival director
 Emanuel Nobs (1910–1985), Swiss painter
 Ernst Nobs (1886-1957), Swiss politician
 Heidi Baader-Nobs (born 1940), Swiss composer
 Olivia Nobs (born 1982), Swiss snowboarder

References